Tribuna Israelita (Jewish Forum) is one of the main Jewish community organizations in Mexico. The organization has a long-standing cooperative relationship with the main Jewish community organization, Comité Central de la Comunidad Judía de México (CCCJM), and participates in meetings with the World Jewish Congress.

History
Israelite Tribune was founded in 1944 by the CCCJM to promote dialogue with community leaders in Mexico.

References

External links
 Official website

Jews and Judaism in Mexico
Jewish Mexican history
Jewish communities in Mexico
Organizations established in 1944